Mbari is a visual art form practiced by the Igbo people in southeast Nigeria consisting of a sacred two- story house constructed as a propitiatory rite.  Mbari houses of the Owerri-Igbo, which are large opened-sided square planned shelters contain many life-sized, painted figures (sculpted in mud to appease the Alusi (deity) and Ala, the earth goddess, with other deities of thunder and water). Mbari houses are made as a gift to Ala, as a way to acknowledge Ala's charitable and overarching presence. Some Mbari houses are dedicated strictly and solely to Ala. Sometimes, however, other gods are represented along with Ala in the structure.  Other sculptures which could be included are of officials, craftsmen, foreigners (mainly Europeans), animals, legendary creatures and ancestors. Mbari houses take years to build and building them is regarded as sacred. Along with being representations of  abundances and harmony, they are most usually created during times of peace and stability. A ceremony is performed within the structure for a gathering of town leaders.  After the ritual is complete, going in or even looking at the Mbari house is considered taboo.  The building was not maintained and decayed in the elements.

Chinua Achebe, renowned Nigerian novelist and literary theorist said, in his essay on Mbari, "Mbari was a celebration through art of the world and of life lived in it. It was performed by the community on command by its presiding deity, usually the Earth goddess, Ala, who combined two formidable roles in the Igbo pantheon as fountain of creativity in the world and custodian of the moral order in human society." The Mbari Club — a cultural centre for writers and artists co-founded in 1961 by Ulli Beier and others in Ibadan — was so named at Achebe's suggestion.

References

Igbo art
Igbo religion